Rojano is a surname. Notable people with the surname include:

Antonio Rojano (born 1991), Argentine footballer 
Dionisio Emanuel Villalba Rojano (born 1989), Spanish footballer

See also
Romano (name)